Acremma albipoda is a moth in the family Erebidae. It was described by Emilio Berio in 1959. It is found in Madagascar.

References

Boletobiinae
Moths of Madagascar
Taxa named by Emilio Berio
Moths described in 1959